Berthe-Sultana Bénichou-Aboulker (16 May 1888 – 19 August 1942) was a Jewish-Algerian poet and playwright who wrote in French. Her play La Kahena, reine berbière (1933) was the "first work published by a Jewish woman in Algeria".

Life
She was the daughter of Adélaïde Azoubib (poet and prose writer) and her second husband, Mardochée Bénichou. She had at least one sibling, a brother, Raymond Benichou. Her husband, Henri Aboulker, was a surgeon and professor; their son, José Aboulker was a surgeon and political figure; and their daughter Colette Béatrice Aboulker-Muscat was a renowned Kabbalah teacher who received the Croix de Guerre for her role in the Algerian Resistance and, in 1995, was awarded the prestigious Yakir Yerushalayim award.

References

Bibliography

External links
Berthe Bénichou-Aboulker Jewish Women's Archive

1888 births
1942 deaths
20th-century Algerian poets
Algerian dramatists and playwrights
Algerian Jews
Algerian women writers
Algerian writers
People from Oran
People from Algiers
Algerian writers in French
20th-century women writers
Jewish writers
Jewish women writers
Women dramatists and playwrights
Algerian women poets